Home Recordings: Americana is an album by American singer-songwriter Jim Croce, released in 2003. This album is a compilation of unreleased tracks and demos. This compilation was the first new material of Jim Croce's work released since 1973. The album also contains liner notes written by Croce's son A.J. Croce and his wife Ingrid Croce. The material was recorded in 1967 at his Pennsylvania kitchen table on an old Wollensak reel-to-reel tape recorder.

Background
A.J. Croce who co-produced the album told Billboard, "It was a very emotional experience for me. I really got to know a piece of my father that I'd never known. I'm influenced by old American music, of course, and by British pop music and rock'n'roll. I felt he was influenced by troubadours like Woody Guthrie and knew of his influences from the '20s and '30s—but never really heard them in his music. But he made a lot of home tapes of things he loved, and when I listened to them, I heard him play songs I had played when I was that age. He was discovering what he was about in these tapes. You can hear all these classic folk songs or jazz or blues or drinking songs, as well as early pieces of songs like 'Time in a Bottle' that were coming out of them. And at first he played his own songs timidly, whereas just a year or two later he had enormous confidence in playing his own material."

Track listing

Personnel
Jim Croce – guitar, vocals

References

Jim Croce albums
Compilation albums published posthumously
2003 compilation albums